Bander Faleh (born 25 January 1994) is a Saudi Arabian professional footballer who plays as an attacking-midfielder for Al-Jabalain.

Career
Bander Faleh began his career at the youth team of Arar He arrived for the first team in 2015. On 7 June 2017, Bander Faleh joined with Al-Orobah . On 27 August 2019, Bander Faleh is back with Arar . On 4 February 2020, Bander Faleh joined Saudi Professional League side Al-Raed. On 29 August 2021, Faleh joined Al-Shoulla on loan. On 16 July 2022, Bander Faleh joined Al-Jabalain.

References

1994 births
Living people
Association football midfielders
Saudi Arabian footballers
Saudi Professional League players
Saudi First Division League players
Saudi Second Division players
Saudi Fourth Division players
Arar FC players
Al-Orobah FC players
Al-Raed FC players
Al-Shoulla FC players
Al-Jabalain FC players
People from Arar, Saudi Arabia